John Sargent (June 21, 1799 – December 5, 1880) was a Massachusetts politician who served in both branches of the Massachusetts legislature, as a member and President of the Cambridge Common Council, and as the Mayor of Cambridge, Massachusetts.

Personal life 
John Sargent was born in Hillsborough, New Hampshire on June 21, 1799. He married Lucetta Tuttle, and they remained married until her death in 1855. John himself died on December 5, 1880, in Cambridge, Massachusetts.

See also
 1876 Massachusetts legislature

References

New England Historic Genealogical Society, Memorial Biographies of New England Historic Genealogical Society Volume VIII,  New England Historic Genealogical Society, p. 22. (1907).

Notes

1799 births
1880 deaths
Mayors of Cambridge, Massachusetts
Members of the Massachusetts House of Representatives
Massachusetts state senators
Massachusetts city council members
Massachusetts Whigs
19th-century American politicians
Massachusetts Free Soilers
Massachusetts Republicans

People from Hillsborough, New Hampshire